The Vijay for Best Find of the Year is given by STAR Vijay as part of its annual Vijay Awards ceremony for Tamil  (Kollywood) films.

The list
Here is a list of the award winners and the films for which they won.

Nominations
2007 Venkat Prabhu (director) - Chennai 600028
Kadhir (cinematographer) - Polladhavan
Ram (director) - Katrathu Tamil
Rohini (lyricist) - Pachaikili Muthucharam
Vetrimaaran - pollathavan

See also
 Tamil cinema
 Cinema of India

References

Find